Ruellia flava is a plant native to the Cerrado vegetation of Brazil.

flava
Flora of Brazil